Rogoz may refer to the following villages:
In Romania:
 Rogoz, a village in Albac Commune, Alba County
 Rogoz, a village near the town of Beliu, Arad County
 Rogoz, a village in Sâmbăta Commune, Bihor County
 Rogoz, a village in the town of Târgu Lăpuş, Maramureș County
 Rogoz de Beliu, a village in Craiva Commune, Arad County

In Poland:
Rogoż, Lower Silesian Voivodeship (south-west Poland)
Rogóż, Lidzbark County, Warmian-Masurian Voivodeship (north Poland)
Rogóż, Nidzica County, Warmian-Masurian Voivodeship (north Poland)

See also